The Kauffman Fellowship is a two-year educational, networking, and leadership development program for venture capitalists. It was named after Ewing Marion Kauffman. The Kauffman Fellows Program is a nonprofit with a 20-year history of identifying, educating, mentoring and networking future venture capitalists. As of 2011, it had graduated more than 250 fellows, who have worked at venture firms in the U.S. and internationally.

Center for Venture Education 
The Kauffman Fellows Program originated as an endeavor of the Ewing Marion Kauffman Foundation, from which it was spun out in 2000, and is now managed by the Center for Venture Education, based in Palo Alto, California.

Notable Kauffman Fellows 
Trish Costello, Portfolia
Mamoon Hamid, Social Capital
Jenny Lee, GGV Capital
Mala Gaonkar
Michael McCullough
Justin Rockefeller

References

Venture capital